The TAI Anka is a family of unmanned aerial vehicles developed by Turkish Aerospace Industries primarily for the Turkish Air Force. Envisioned in the early 2000s for aerial surveillance and reconnaissance missions, Anka has evolved into a modular platform with synthetic aperture radar, precise weapons and satellite communication.

The basic version, Anka-A, was classified as a medium-altitude long-endurance unmanned aerial vehicle for reconnaissance missions. Introduced in 2010, Anka granted its first contract in 2013 from Turkish Air Force. The Force requested further studies in advanced uninterrupted intelligence, reconnaissance and communication technologies. The aircraft was set to a long development phase to introduce national mission computer, national flight control system, synthetic aperture radar, indigenous engine and friend or foe identification system. Anka-B made its first flight in 2014 and completed factory tests in 2015. In 2017, Turkish Aerospace Industries introduced Anka-S and the aircraft entered service with the Turkish Air Force.

Turkish Aerospace Industries offers the aircraft in two versions, Anka-B and Anka-S. Anka-I was developed specifically for Turkey's National Intelligence Organization for signal intelligence. Anka has accumulated more than 90,000 flight hours as of March 2021.

The drone is named after Phoenix, a mythological creature called Zümrüd-ü Anka in Turkish.

Design

The TUAV system consists of three air vehicles (A/V), a ground control station (GCS), a ground data terminal (GDT), an automatic take-off and landing system (ATOLS), a transportable image exploitation system (TIES), a remote video terminal (RVT), and various ground support equipment (GSE).

The TUAV system, which is designed for night and day missions including adverse weather conditions, performs real-time image intelligence, surveillance, reconnaissance, moving/stationary target detection, recognition, identification, and tracking missions.

While the TUAV system has an open architecture to support other payloads and missions, the air vehicle is typically configured to carry the following payloads:

 Electro-optic color day camera (EO day TV)
 Electro-optic/forward-looking infrared/laser rangefinder/laser designator and spotter camera (EO/FLIR/LRF/LDS)
 Synthetic-aperture radar/ground moving target indicator (SAR/GMTI)
 Inverse synthetic-aperture radar (ISAR)

The platform is also equipped with a digital flight control system, electro-mechanical actuators, and flight control sensor systems such as GPS, pitot-static, air data computer, navigation sensor, transducers, temperature, pressure, displacement sensors, etc. Various tasks are distributed along flight management computers and auxiliary control boxes. Identification and communication units and interface computers are employed in order to establish real time wide band communication and provide test and diagnostics functions. An air traffic radio is also integrated in the communication system for the integration of the aircraft into the civilian airspace. All flight critical equipment are dual or triple redundant and emergency modes of operational scenarios are taken into consideration for fail safe design.

All airborne and ground-based flight control software is developed by TAI while payload and other relevant hardware and software items are aimed to be developed by national sub-contractors, such as Aselsan, AYESAS, and MilSOFT.

UAV operations are supported by highly sophisticated ground control system with complete redundancy, developed by a domestic defence company Savronik. Whole mission segments of the air vehicle can be managed, monitored and controlled by a GCS. A pre-programmed mission plan can be loaded before the flight begins or can be altered during the flight. All the imagery stream of the payloads can be displayed and recorded in real time and all the payloads can be controlled from the GCS. ATOLS allows the air vehicle to perform its operation without operator intervention, including the most critical phases which are landing and take-off.

In TIES, valuable intelligence information can be obtained by the analysis of bulky imagery data. TIES operators can initiate intelligence missions prior to or during flight. Refined information flows to the upper command layer in order to assist the headquarters to monitor a network of TUAV systems and benefit from the gathered intelligence information. Another interface of the TUAV system is the RVT, with which other friendly units who are close to the target area can utilize the real time imagery that TUAV air vehicle broadcasts.

Development
 
The contract regarding the development of an indigenous Medium Altitude Long Endurance (MALE) Unmanned Aerial Vehicle (UAV) system for the reconnaissance requirements of the Turkish Armed Forces became effective on 24 December 2004. Within the framework of the program, a total of three prototypes and ground systems will be designed, developed, manufactured, and tested by mid-2011 as part of the prototype development phase. Subsequently, in 2012, the serial production phase of Anka-A would be launched and additional 10 systems (meaning 30 air vehicles) built for the Turkish Air Force.

 On 30 December 2010, the first TAI Anka unmanned aerial vehicle completed its debut flight, with 14 minutes of cruising, at 15:45 local time. Defence Minister Vecdi Gönül confirmed the flight.
 On 5 May 2011, TAI released the test flight video of Anka. Anka-A flew a test and calibration mission of 2h 30m.
 Turkish Aerospace Industries announced on 25 October 2011 that the Anka had successfully completed its subsequent flight and landing tests and that it will now be in the Turkish Air Force inventory in 2012 that is much earlier than expected. Footage released by TAI also shows the Anka landing successfully putting all speculation abouts its crash landings to rest.
 On 22 November 2011, the Anka held the follow-up test flight for 6 hours at 20,000 ft. The vehicle demonstrated its automatic take-off and landing system for the first time.
 On 5 January 2012, Defence Industry Executive Committee authorized Undersecretariat for Defence Industries to commence talks with Turkish Aerospace Industries for the serial production of 10 Anka vehicles.
 On 27 September 2012, an Anka prototype crashed during a flight test due to a technical problem.
 On 20 January 2013, Anka completed acceptance tests by the Turkish Air Force. The final acceptance tests were conducted near Ankara, and involved an 18‑hour‑long, 200 km ring flight. The tests also included a night landing in adverse weather conditions. The Anka has flown more than 140 hours and reached and altitude of 26,000 feet.
 On 13 May 2013, the Pakistan Aeronautical Complex, Kamra handed over the first batch of Anka UAV parts to Turkish Aerospace Industries during IDEF 2013 at Istanbul, Turkey.
 On 6 December 2013, another Anka UAV crashed in southeastern Turkey during a day flight.
 On 30 January 2015, Undersecretariat of Defense Industry announced that the new generation high performance Anka Blok-B unmanned aerial vehicle completed the tests of different autopilot and landing modes in the first flight with automatic take-off and landing
 Anka was extensively used during Operation Euphrates Shield While the aircraft participated in many counter-terrorism operations within the Turkish Armed Forces, it also played an active role during operations in Syria and Iraq such as Operation Olive Branch, Operation Claw (2019–2020), Operation Peace Spring, Operation Spring Shield, Operation Kiran and Operations Claw-Eagle and Tiger.In this way, useful experiences was made in the development of the aircraft.
 The first deliveries of the ANKA-S version began in early 2017.
 Unmanned target drone Şimşek, manufactured by TAI, integrated into ANKA UAV with a catapult, was launched from the Anka-B aircraft. Consequently, for the first time, a target unmanned aerial vehicle was launched from a MALE class UAV.
Istanbul based CTech company, has developed portable satellite communication systems with domestic facilities. The system was first integrated into TUSAŞ (Turkish Aerospace) production Anka-S UAVs.
 In May 2021, Turkish Aerospace Industries updated product specifications. With the new update, Anka's payload capacity and endurance were revised to 350+ kilograms and 30 hours, respectfully.

Configurations
Turkey's Directorate for Defence Industries had stressed advanced variants of the Anka with greater payload capacity, extending Block-A capabilities to the features like:
SATCOM
SIGINT
Air-to-ground missiles
According to the authority, Anka would eventually have an indigenous 155 hp turbo-prop engine developed by TUSAŞ Engine Industries (TEI), with cooperation of local companies in the future.

Variants

Anka +A
On 19 July 2012, the Turkish Defense Industry Executive Committee (SSIK) announced that Turkish Aerospace Industries had commenced research and development for the design and development of a "hunter killer" High-Altitude Long-Endurance version of the Anka UAV, named the Anka +A. It was planned that Anka +A will carry Cirit missiles of Turkey's ROKETSAN. The weight of Anka +A UCAV would be more than 4 tons compared to Anka Block A's 1.5 tons. It was highly expected that the UCAV would be presented to public in the events of IDEF'13 on 7–10 May 2013.

Anka-B 

On 30 January 2015, the Anka-B completed its maiden flight successfully. Anka Block B is an improved version of the Anka Block A. The UAV carries an Aselsan synthetic aperture radar/ground moving-target indicator payload in addition to the platform's electro-optical/infrared sensor. During the maiden flight, Anka-B successfully performed "basic shakedown" and auto-landing. The Anka Block B also has a greater payload capacity than that of the Anka-A which includes SAR/ISAR/GMTI radar (in addition to the cameras of Anka A) that obtains and remits high resolution intelligence data back to base. The Anka Block B paved the way for weaponisation of the platform in the foreseeable future. Anka Block B passed 30.000 feet, 26 hours and 200 km radius during the test flights. Turkish Air Force ordered 10 Anka Block B in 2013 at a cost of $300 million.

Anka-S 

Anka-S is a serial production configuration of Anka. It is equipped with a SATCOM antenna and a national flight control computer. Like Block A and Block B, Anka-S is powered by Thielert Centurion 2.0S. On the other hand, Turkish Engine Industries (TEI) indigenously developed TEI PD170 and PD180st engines that are capable of running with diesel and JP-8 jet fuel.

On 25 October 2013, Turkish Undersecretariat for Defence Industry (SSM) ordered 10 Anka-S UAVs and 12 ground control stations for $290 million ($220.6 million + TRY 137 million). The UAVs would be delivered in three batches (2+4+4).

In 2016, media reported that the TAI was manufacturing 4 Anka-S UAVs for the armed forces. The first two of these aircraft were to be equipped with StarFIRE 380-HDL FLIR payload. However, these would be replaced with Aselsan CATS later on.

On 17 August 2018, Directorate for Defence Industries announced that the Anka-S completed its first live fire tests. The platform was tested with MAM-L ammunition developed by the Roketsan. In September, Ismail Demir, director of the Turkey's defence industry authority, shared a picture of the first Anka-S equipped with Aselsan CATS optical system. TAI delivered 2 more Anka-S to Turkish Air Force in September 2018, increasing the Anka-S inventory of Turkish Air Force to 8 aircraft. TAI is planning to deliver a total of 10 Anka-S to Turkish Air Force before 2019.

In August 2018, the Anka-S carried out Turkey's first "satellite-controlled airstrike" according to the Turkish Presidency of Defense Industries. In December, Anka completed its first flight with an engine manufactured domestically. In 2019, Anka broke its endurance records, flying longer than 24 hours.

Although Anka have an operational range of about 100 miles, satellite-enabled Anka-S is capable of flying beyond "line of sight".

Anka-I 
Anka-I is an electronic warfare and intelligence UAV developed for the National Intelligence Organization. The aircraft is equipped with electronic warfare and intelligence systems (ELINT and COMINT).

Anka-2 
TAI Aksungur (code name: Anka-2) is a twin-engined UAV developed primarily from Anka-S.

Anka-3 
Turkiye's Vice President Fuat Oktay declared that a new jet engine version of the UCAV, dubbed Anka-3, was in development and would be out in 2023.

The features and concept visuals of the aircraft have been revealed which shows a low-observable stealth technology with a flying-wing design.

Operational history
On 5 February 2016 Anka drones performed its first mission flight in Turkey's eastern province of Elazığ performing a four-hour exploration and observation flight.

In 2018, during the course of Turkey's Operation Olive Branch, the UAV for the first time used the Smart Micro Munition, MAM-L.

During the course of the Turkish involvement on the Syrian Civil war Syrian Air defenses shot down an Anka-S near Dadikah, southeastern countryside of Idlib on 25 February 2020.

On 27 February 2020 following the Turkish losses inflicted by Russian-backed Syrian government in northwestern Syria, Turkey launched Operation Spring Shield, with multiple Anka-S and Bayraktar TB2 drones deployed and extensively. The deployment was assessed by experts to be a tactical game-changer.

On 1 March 2020, an Anka-S was shot down while operating in the Syrian province of Idlib by an air defence system, near the town of Saraqib.

On 19 April 2020, amid the Second Libyan Civil War a combat drone was shot down in Alwhaska, near Misrata, GNA sources claimed the downed drone was a LNA Wing Loong II in turn LNA claimed they shot down a TAI Anka combat drone, however a UN Security Council report asserted the downed drone was a TAI Anka drone operated by GNA.

On 23 May 2020, a second Anka drone backing the GNA forces is reported lost in Tarhouna, shot down by LNA air defenses.

In October 2022, it was revealed that Turkey was using Anka for dropping Sonobuoy in the sea, in order to locate Greek submarines.

Export history

 On 23 November 2012, Egypt signed a contract with Turkish Aerospace Industries to purchase 10 Anka UAV's. The deal was later cancelled. Some sources claimed that the cancellation was due to the disagreements between AK Parti government of then Prime Minister Recep Tayyip Erdoğan and the Egyptian military regime led by General Abdel Fattah el-Sisi, while other sources stated the deal was never finalized. Recep Tayyip Erdogan was supporting the first democratically elected president in Egypt's, who had won the Egyptian presidential election in 2012, before getting ousted in a military coup on July 3, 2013.
 In April 2013, Saudi Arabian officials expressed interest in the Anka UAV. In November 2017, a Turkish official confirmed talks had been ongoing since 2013 for the purchase of 6 systems, but no official contract had been signed yet. The official stated specific requirements regarding reconnaissance capability and a possible transfer of technology to Saudi Arabia. A different source noted budgetary challenges to be overcome due to Saudi Arabia demanding a lower price due to lower oil prices constraining Saudi income.
 In late November 2018, during IDEAS 2018, it was confirmed that Pakistan Navy is interested in Anka-S and has begun negotiations with Turkish Aerospace Industries for this UAV.
In December  2019, TAI has opened its first office in Pakistan at the country's National Science & Technology Park. On August 24, 2021 Turkish Aerospace Industries (TAI) signed a contract with Pakistan’s National Engineering and Science Commission (NESCOM) to jointly produce Anka military drones, the company revealed in a statement.
 A contract was signed in March 2020 for 3 Anka-S and 3 command centers at $USD 80 million.
On 13 November 2021, Tunisia has officially accepted its first Anka-S UAV.

Operators 

 
 Algerian People's National Army — 10 on order
 
 Chad National Army — 2 on order
 
 Indonesian National Armed Forces — 12 on order
 
 Kazakh Air Defense Forces — Kazakhstan signed an agreement in 2022 to buy 3 TAI made Anka drones and co-manufacture 30 additional units inside Kazakhstan.

 
 Kyrgyz Air Force — Unknown number on order.

 
 Royal Malaysian Air Force — Defence minister of Malaysia, Hishammuddin Hussein, announced in 2022 that Malaysia will buy 3 MALE-UAS Anka drone from TAI.
 
 Tunisian Air Force — A contract was signed in March 2020 for 3 Anka-S and 3 command centers at $USD 80 million. The country made its first Anka UAV operational on 13 November 2021.
 
Turkish Air Force — 14 active
Turkish National Intelligence Organization — Anka-I variant
Turkish Naval Forces — 8 active
Gendarmerie General Command —  2 Anka-B and 6 Anka-S

Specifications (Anka-S)

See also

References

External links

 TAI Anka Documentary
 TAI Anka Presentation
 Flight Global: Turkey reveals MALE UAV details
 East West Studies: Turkish Unmanned Aerial Vehicle (TIHA) Program

International unmanned aerial vehicles
Unmanned military aircraft of Turkey
Medium-altitude long-endurance unmanned aerial vehicles
Military robots
Single-engined pusher aircraft
V-tail aircraft
Anka
Synthetic aperture radar
Aircraft first flown in 2010